Dehmel is a surname. Notable people with the surname include:

 Richard Dehmel (1863–1920), German poet and writer
 Jürgen Dehmel (born 1958), German bass player and songwriter
 Joachim Dehmel (born 1969), German middle-distance runner 
 Ernst Dehmel (1915–1945), German major during World War II